U.S. Routes in the U.S. state of New Mexico account for  of the state highway system. The first United States Numbered Highways U.S. Routes were formed in 1926, and served as the primary thoroughfares across the entire state. Twenty six of the 33 counties in New Mexico are served by current U.S. Routes. The only counties lacking U.S. Route coverage are: Bernalillo, Cibola, Harding, Los Alamos, Mora, Sierra, and Valencia.

One decommissioned U.S. Route, U.S. Route 66, colloquially known as the nation's Mother Road, and briefly known as U.S. Route 60, crossed through Northern New Mexico, connecting the cities of Albuquerque and Gallup. The state recognized its historical value, and has posted commemorative signs, and has painted the old shield on some of the roadways that make up the path of the former highway, such as New Mexico State Road 333. Other highways have been renamed or renumbered, such as U.S. Route 491, which was formerly U.S. Route 666. With the 666 designation, the road was nicknamed Devil's Highway because of the common Christian belief that 666 is the Number of the Beast. The effort to get the route renumbered was led by New Mexico Governor Bill Richardson.

U.S. Route 160, in conjunction with New Mexico State Road 597, provide access to the Four Corners Monument where the states of Arizona, New Mexico, Colorado, and Utah meet.

List

Special routes

See also

Notes

References

External links 
New Mexico Highways

U.S. Routes